The Port of Davao, or Davao Port, is a seaport located in Davao, Philippines. The Port of Davao consists of a number of ports, all within Davao Gulf which is part of the Celebes Sea, but its main office and seaport is located at Brgy. Sasa, Davao City. The Port of Davao is largely dominated by container cargo, raw materials exportation, bulk cargo, general cargo, and passenger traffic facilities.

About

Davao Port, or the Port of Davao, is one of the Philippines major seaports alongside Manila, Subic, Cebu, Zamboanga, and others. The Port of Davao, often called Port District of Davao, includes Davao City and the five provinces. Davao port services inter-island and international shipments. The city is situated 974 kilometers south of Manila, on the shore of Davao Gulf. "Davao" also refers to five provinces: Davao de Oro, Davao del Norte, Davao del Sur, Davao Occidental, and Davao Oriental. Davao City is located in Davao del Sur but is politically and administratively independent of the province. The access to the port of entry in Davao City is through Davao Gulf, which has two approaches. One is at Pakiputan Strait between Davao and the water west of Samal Island. The other approach is at the east side of Samal Island mainly used as an exit channel of vessels departing from points north of Davao Gulf. Access to the subport of entry in Mati, Davao Oriental is through Pujada Bay. Davao Gulf is situated on the south coast of Mindanao, the second largest island in the Philippines.

The port itself is the most important in Mindanao and also has the busiest international container port in both Visayas and Mindanao. The port serves as the gateway to the southern Philippines and is considered as the best-performing port in Mindanao. A number of passenger ship-lines operate to Davao, including WG&A Superferry.

History
The port opened in the early 1900s for the international exportation of agricultural products in then-Davao Province, mostly from Davao City. It was opened for the prospectors and entrepreneurs in the city to export their agricultural produce internationally. Due to the ever-expanding economy of the city, it later became one of the busiest seaports in the country.

In World War II, the port became a landing and anchor zone for American naval forces participating in the Battle of Davao.

Facilities

Apart from the government pier and private pier, a number of piers and wharves exist in the Davao Port region specifically for commercial use. Ana pier in  mud. The anchorage is well protected except during strong southwest monsoon. Pilotage is compulsory for foreign-going vessels with 100 GT and over; and for domestic vessels with 75 GT and over. Request for pilot should be made 48 hours in advance, and contact made on VHF 2 hours before arrival.

Davao City and the Port of Davao has 2 government international seaports, that of the Sasa International Port and the Sta. Ana Wharf, and 9 privately owned ports. The city government is currently in the process of taking over the management of the seaports to modernize facilities, such as 3 big modern quayside cranes and to expand capacity. In addition, the Toril international Fish Port Complex accommodates small and large-scale fishing activities as well as provides among others cold-storage facilities.

Below is a list of major piers and wharves within Davao Port.

Sasa International Seaport

Located in Brgy. Sasa, Davao City, Sasa International Seaport is the main seaport serving the Davao Gulf area as the main base of the port. It is generally used for container and international shipping and operated by the International Container Terminal Services inc., which also operates at the Port of Manila and Port of Subic. It is one of the largest piers in the Port area and also the busiest.

Samal Ferry Wharf

Located just north of the International Seaport at Km11, Sasa, Davao City. Home to the roll on / roll off vehicle and passenger ferry from Davao City to Samal Island. In December 2021, the Mae Wess Company (who operate the ferry service) announced they would begin running the service 24 hours a day.

Sta. Ana Pier
Located in Davao Chinatown, Magsaysay St., Davao City, Sta. Ana Pier handles mainly domestic and passenger vessels.

Mati Wharf, Mati City, Davao Oriental
Used primarily for corn, copra, logs, and general cargo.

Pacific International Terminal Pier
Non-commercial port that handles exportation of bananas and other fruit products.

Legaspi Oil Company Pier
Non-commercial port that handles exportation of coconut products such as copra, coco oil & copra pellets.

Universal Robina Pier
Handles importation of flour grains and similar types.

Davao Union Cement Pier 
Handles exportation of cement to coal and other ore products.

Piso Point Port 
Located at Piso Point, Banaybanay town, Davao Oriental province, this port is primarily used for mineral stockpiling and exportation.

Tefasco pier
Handles asphalt and similar products.

Stevedorage Services Corporation pier
The Stevedorage Services Corporation pier handles general cargo, bulk cargo, vehicles and lumber. It is one of the busiest piers in the port.

Data

See also
List of East Asian ports
Port of Manila
Port of Zamboanga
Davao City
Metro Davao
Davao Gulf

References

External links
 Davao Integrated Port and Stevedoring Services Corporation (DIPSSCOR)
 Port of Davao: In Focus

Davao Port
Buildings and structures in Davao City
Transportation in Mindanao